In physics and mathematics, in the area of dynamical systems, an elastic pendulum (also called spring pendulum or swinging spring) is a physical system where a piece of mass is connected to a spring so that the resulting motion contains  elements of both a simple pendulum and a one-dimensional spring-mass system. The system exhibits chaotic behaviour and is sensitive to initial conditions. The motion of an elastic pendulum is governed by a set of coupled ordinary differential equations.

Analysis and interpretation

The system is much more complex than a simple pendulum, as the properties of the spring add an extra dimension of freedom to the system.  For example, when the spring compresses, the shorter radius causes the spring to move faster due to the conservation of angular momentum. It is also possible that the spring has a range that is overtaken by the motion of the pendulum, making it practically neutral to the motion of the pendulum.

Lagrangian
The spring has the rest length  and can be stretched by a length .

The Lagrangian  is: 

See. Hooke's law is the potential energy of the spring itself:

where  is the spring constant.

The potential energy from gravity, on the other hand, is determined by the height of the mass. For a given angle and displacement, the potential energy is:

where  is the gravitational acceleration.

The kinetic energy is given by:

where  is the velocity of the mass. To relate  to the other variables, the velocity is written as a combination of a movement along and perpendicular to the spring:

So the Lagrangian becomes:

Equations of motion

For :

 isolated:

And for :

 isolated:

The elastic pendulum is now described with two coupled ordinary differential equations. These can be solved numerically. Furthermore, one can use analytical methods to study the intriguing phenomenon of order-chaos-order in this system.

See also
 Double pendulum
 Duffing oscillator
 Pendulum (mathematics)
 Spring-mass system

References

Further reading

External links
 Holovatsky V., Holovatska Y. (2019) "Oscillations of an elastic pendulum" (interactive animation), Wolfram Demonstrations Project, published February 19, 2019.

Chaotic maps
Dynamical systems
Mathematical physics
Pendulums